Curtil may refer to:

People
 Daniel Curtil, French canoeist
 Emmanuel Curtil, French actor
 Marie-France Curtil, French canoeist

Places
 Curtil-Saint-Seine, Côte-d'Or department, France
 Curtil-Vergy, Côte-d'Or department, France
 Curtil-sous-Buffières, Bourgogne-Franche-Comté, France
 Curtil-sous-Burnand, Bourgogne-Franche-Comté, France